The Shenzhen Dayun Arena is an arena located in Shenzhen, China.  It was completed in 2011 for the 2011 Summer Universiade.  It is used for the basketball, ice hockey and gymnastics events.  The arena is the home of the Shenzhen KRS Vanke Rays, formerly called Kunlun Red Star WIH, of the Russian Women's Hockey League.

The capacity of the arena is 18,000 spectators and it opened in August 2011.

References

External links
Graphic of exterior of arena
Information on arena

Indoor arenas in China
Sports venues in Shenzhen
Ice hockey venues
2011 establishments in China
KRS Vanke Rays